The McCabe Building in Victoria, Texas was built in 1908. The McCabe Building is an example of a local two story frame commercial structure. J. H. McCabe operated a grocery business in the building. The building was listed on the National Register of Historic Places on December 19, 1986.

A neighboring business, Wholesale Tire Company, purchased the lot and building in 2013 because they needed more room for inventory and work space. The building was inspected and found to be losing structural integrity. The business decided it would be too large an investment to incorporate the building into their expansion plans. The building was scheduled to be demolished.

See also

National Register of Historic Places listings in Victoria County, Texas

References

External links

Houses on the National Register of Historic Places in Texas
Houses completed in 1908
Houses in Victoria, Texas
National Register of Historic Places in Victoria, Texas
1908 establishments in Texas